is a district of Shinagawa, Tokyo, Japan. This is a single, discrete municipal unit, without any wards or sub-districts.

Education
Shinagawa City Board of Education operates public elementary and junior high schools.

All of Higashi-Yashio is zoned to Jonan No. 2 Elementary School (城南第二小学校) and Tokai Junior High School (東海中学校).

References

External links

Districts of Shinagawa